Segi Point Airfield is a former World War II airfield on New Georgia in the Solomon Islands archipelago.

History

World War II
The Segi (Seghe) Point area was the base of the British Commonwealth coastwatcher, Donald Gilbert Kennedy, who had monitored Japanese shipping and aircraft (reporting by radio) and also rescued American airman who were shot down in the territory held by the Japanese. In May and June 1943 Japanese patrols moved into the Segi Point area. The Segi Point area was secured by the 4th Marine Raider Battalion on 30 June 1943 in the opening phase of the New Georgia Campaign. The 20th, 24th and 47th Naval Construction Battalions landed with the Marines and immediately began construction of a fighter airstrip. Bad weather and poor soil conditions delayed construction, but by 18 July a coral-surfaced  by  runway was ready for use. By the end of July taxiways and revetments had been completed.

USAAF units based at Segi Point included:
44th Pursuit Squadron operating P-40s

US Navy units based at Segi Point included:
VB-305 operating SBDs
VF-33 operating F6Fs
VF-38 operating F6Fs
VF-40 operating F6Fs

Postwar
The airfield remains in use today as Seghe Airport.

See also
Barakoma Airfield
Munda Airport
Ondonga Airfield
United States Army Air Forces in the South Pacific Area

References

Airfields of the United States Navy
Airfields of the United States Army Air Forces in the Pacific Ocean theatre of World War II
Military installations closed in the 1940s
Closed installations of the United States Navy